Bavra is a village in the Ashotsk Municipality of the Shirak Province of Armenia. The Statistical Committee of Armenia reported its population was 490 as per the 2011 census, down from 538 reported at the 2001 census. 

The inhabitants of the village are mainly followers of the Armenian Catholic Church. The Surp Nshan Armenian Catholic church of the village was consecrated in December 2012, following a construction period of 5 years.

Bavra is one of three border gates between Armenia and neighboring Georgia. The new border checkpoint complex in Bavra was opened on 1 October 2017, with the presence of president Serzh Sargsyan.

Demographics
The population of the village since 1926 is as follows:

References 

Communities in Shirak Province
Populated places in Shirak Province